Federico Pizarro (born 7 September 1986) is an Argentine handball player for UNLu and the Argentina men's national handball team.

He defended Argentina at the 2012 Summer Olympics in London. He participated at the 2015 World Men's Handball Championship in Qatar.

Individual awards and achievements
Torneo Nacional de Clubes 2016: Best right back
2016 Pan American Men's Club Handball Championship: Best right back
2016 Pan American Men's Club Handball Championship: MVP
2016 Pan American Men's Club Handball Championship: Top scorer
Torneo Nacional de Clubes 2017: Top scorer

References

External links

1986 births
Living people
Argentine male handball players
Olympic handball players of Argentina
Handball players at the 2012 Summer Olympics
Handball players at the 2016 Summer Olympics
Sportspeople from Buenos Aires
Pan American Games gold medalists for Argentina
Handball players at the 2007 Pan American Games
Handball players at the 2011 Pan American Games
Handball players at the 2019 Pan American Games
Pan American Games medalists in handball
Pan American Games silver medalists for Argentina
South American Games silver medalists for Argentina
South American Games medalists in handball
Competitors at the 2018 South American Games
Medalists at the 2007 Pan American Games
Medalists at the 2019 Pan American Games
Medalists at the 2011 Pan American Games
Handball players at the 2020 Summer Olympics
21st-century Argentine people